Storytel AB is a Stockholm-based e-book and audiobook subscription service. 

It compares with Audible using a monthly credit model, and is available in more than 25 countries. Its English audiobook service Audiobooks.com is available in more than 150 countries.

History
Storytel was founded in 2006 by Jonas Tellander and Jon Hauksson. The company bought Sweden's largest book publisher, Norstedts förlag, in 2016.

In 2016, Storytel acquired the Danish book service Mofibo.

In 2017, Storytel acquired the Danish publisher People's Press.  

In 2017, Storytel expanded its services to Russia, Spain, India and the United Arab Emirates.

In 2018, Storytel purchased the Turkish audiobook service Seslenen Kitaplar, and Turkey became the 19th country in which Storytel services exist.

In September 2019 it acquired Finland's oldest publshing house Gummerus. 

In July 2020 it acquired a 70 percent stake in Icelandic publishing house Forlagið. 

In January 2021 it surpassed 1.5 million paid subscribers.

In November 2021, RBMedia announced that its property Audiobooks.com was being sold to Storytel for $135 million. At the time of purchase, Audiobooks.com was used by about 17% of audiobook buyers, and the acquisition was seen as a way for Storytel to enter the large English-speaking marketplace.

On February 18, 2022, co-founder and CEO from the beginning, Jonas Tellander, stepped down from his position for personal reasons; he is on the board of directors.

In August 2022, Johannes Larcher, a former executive at HBO, was appointed as Storytel's new CEO.

References

External links
Storytel
Audiobooks.com

Audiobook companies and organizations
Subscription services
Swedish companies established in 2006
Internet properties established in 2006
Companies based in Stockholm
Companies listed on Nasdaq Stockholm